The Indiana–Michigan League was a Class D level minor league baseball league that played in the 1910 season. As the name indicates, the league franchises were based in Indiana and Michigan.

History

The Indiana–Michigan League played only the 1910 season, folding on August 21, 1910. The league only played games on Sundays. The Gary team disbanded on June 19, the Ligonier team on June 30. The league permanently folded on August 21, 1910, with the Berrien Springs Grays winning the 1910 championship.

Cities Represented
 Berrien Springs, MI: Berrien Springs Grays 1910
 Dowagiac, MI: Dowagiac 1910
 Elkhart, IN: Elkhart Blue Sox 1910
 Gary, IN: Gary Sand Fleas 1910
 Ligonier, IN: Ligonier 1910
 Niles, MI: Niles Blues 1910

Standings and statistics

1910 Indiana–Michigan League
Gary disbanded June 19.Ligonier disbanded June 30.The league, which played Sunday games only, disbanded August 21.

Sources
The Encyclopedia of Minor league Baseball: Second Edition.

Defunct minor baseball leagues in the United States
Baseball leagues in Michigan
Baseball leagues in Indiana
Sports leagues established in 1910
Sports leagues disestablished in 1910